Ashwin, Ashvin or Asvin may refer to:

 Ashvin (month), a month of the Hindu calendar
 Ashwin (Nepali calendar), a month of the Nepali calendar
 Ashvins, divine twins in Vedic mythology
 Ašvieniai, divine twins in Lithuanian mythology
 Ashwin (given name), including a list of people with the name
 Ashwin (surname), including a list of people with the name
 Ashwin (missile), part of the Indian Ballistic Missile Defence Programme

See also 
 
 
 
 
 Aescwine, an Anglo-Saxon name, whose modern descendant is Ashwin
 Ashwini (disambiguation)
 Ashwin and Falconer, a stained glazing partnership in Australia